Colonel Juan Bautista Alfonseca Baris (23 June 1810, in Santo Domingo – 9 August 1875) was a military officer and composer in the Dominican Republic, known for his role in the development of merengue music. Though the music written by Alfonseca was not, at the time, specifically labeled as "merengue", its incorporation of Dominican folk motifs into Latin formal music such as the danza paved the way for that genre, causing many to label him "the father of merengue".

In addition to his proto-merengue, Alfonseca served as a chapelmaster in Santo Domingo, writing two masses,. Alfonseca also wrote patriotic music; following the Dominican Republic's successful secession from Haiti in 1844 he produced the nation's first proposed national anthem, though it was not adopted.

References

External links
 Esbozo del Origen del Merengue, Biblioteca Pedro Henriquez Urena    
 Historia de los Himnos Dominicanos en Mi Pais Pagina Cultural Dominicana de José E. Marcano M.

Dominican Republic military personnel
Dominican Republic composers
1810 births
1875 deaths
19th-century composers
Merengue musicians